Apalochrus is a genus of beetles belonging to the family Melyridae.

The species of this genus are found in Europe and Africa.

Species:
 Apalochrus femoralis Erichson, 1840 
 Apalochrus fulvicollis Gebler, 1844

References

Melyridae
Cleroidea genera